William Deering Davis (March 9, 1897 – 1965) was an American designer and author who was one of the first American aviators to serve in Italy in World War I. He is also known for his marriages to movie star Louise Brooks and racehorse owner Etti Plesch.

Biography 
William Deering Davis (known by his middle name) was born in Chicago, Illinois, the son of physician Nathan Smith Davis, Jr. and Jessie B. Hopkins, who was the daughter of lawyer James C. Hopkins. During his idle youth in Lake Forest, Illinois, Davis competed with future writer F. Scott Fitzgerald for the affections of Chicago socialite Ginevra King who inspired the character of Daisy Buchanan in The Great Gatsby.

Davis graduated from the University of Chicago. Enlisting in the Aviation Section of the U.S. Signal Corps in 1917, he was sent to Italy, where he flew scouting missions. He was sent home after an accident put him in hospital in Rome for many weeks, ending his service as a war pilot.

A member of the American Institute of Designers, Davis designed both interiors and  furniture such as chairs and lamps, some of it influenced by styles prevalent in the southwestern United States. He wrote or coauthored books on related subjects, including the illustrated volumes Georgetown Houses of the Federal Period (1944), Alexandria Houses, 1750-1830 (1946), and Annapolis Houses: 1700-1775 (1947).

Davis was also a polo player and wrote an illustrated guidebook, The American Cow Pony: The Background, Training, Equipment and Use of the Western Horse (1962), about a small type of stock horse. It covers training and equipment and has a large bibliography.

Personal life 
In 1933, he married movie star Louise Brooks, but Brooks abruptly left him in March 1934 after only five months of marriage, "without a good-bye ... and leaving only a note of her intentions" behind her. According to film historian James Card, Davis was just "another elegant, well-heeled admirer", nothing more. The couple officially divorced in 1938. He was later married to racehorse owner Etti Plesch for two years (1949–51).

References 

1897 births
1965 deaths
American architecture writers
American designers
American World War I pilots
People from Chicago
American polo players